Onward to Olympas was an American metalcore band from Salisbury, North Carolina. The band started making music in 2005, and disbanded in 2013. Their membership was vocalists, Chris Davis and Kramer Lowe, guitarists and vocalist, Andy Simmons, Justin Gage, and Kyle Phillips, drummer and vocalist, Mark Hudson, guitarist, Andrew Higginbotham, bass guitarist, Justin Allman, and drummers, Matt Burnside, Nick Helvey. The band released one independently made album, The End of the Beginning, in 2007, and their lone extended play, Victory at All Costs, in 2008. Their first studio album, This World Is Not My Home, was released by Facedown Records, in 2010. The subsequent studio album, The War within Us, was released by Facedown Records, in 2011. They released, Indicator, with Facedown Records, in 2012, and this was their third and final studio album.

Background
Onward to Olympas was a Christian hardcore and Christian metal band from Salisbury, North Carolina. Their members were vocalists, Chris Davis and Kramer Lowe, guitarists and vocalist, Andy Simmons, Justin Gage, and Kyle Phillips, drummer and vocalist, Mark Hudson, guitarist, Andrew Higginbotham, bass guitarist, Justin Allman, and drummers, Matt Burnside, and Nick Helvey. The band announced on their Facebook page, that the original line-up would reunite to play their debut studio album, This World Is Not My Home, all the way through on September 3, 2015 for it being five-years-old.

Music history
The band commenced as a musical entity in 2005, with their first release, The End of the Beginning, an album that was released independently in 2007. They released an extended play, Victory at All Costs, in 2008, also independently. Their first studio album, This World Is Not My Home, was released by Facedown Records on January 19, 2010. The subsequent studio album, The War within Us, was released by Facedown Records on March 15, 2011. They released, Indicator, another studio album, with Facedown Records on October 9, 2012. This was their final release, as they disbanded on March 29, 2014.

Members
Last known line-up
 Kramer Lowe – vocals (2009–2014, 2015) (now in Forevermore)
 Justin Gage – guitar, vocals (2006–2010, 2015) Currently area director of manufacturing at a large Corporation
 Andrew Higginbotham – guitar (2009–2014, 2015)
 Justin Allman – bass (2006–2014, 2015)
 Matt Burnside – drums  (2006–2010, 2015)
Past members
 Nick Helvey – drums  (2010–2011)
 Andy Simmons – guitar, vocals (2010–2011)
 Kyle Phillips – guitar, vocals (2011–2014)
 Mark Hudson – drums, vocals (2011–2014)
 Chris Davis – vocals (2006–2009)

 Timeline

Discography
Studio albums
 This World Is Not My Home (January 19, 2010, Facedown)
 The War Within Us (March 15, 2011, Facedown)
 Indicator (October 9, 2012, Facedown)
Independent albums
 The End of the Beginning (July 7, 2007, Independent)
EPs
 Victory at All Costs (2008, Independent)

References

External links
 Facebook page
 AllMusic profile
 New Release Today profile

Musical groups from North Carolina
American melodic death metal musical groups
2006 establishments in North Carolina
2013 disestablishments in North Carolina
Musical groups established in 2006
Musical groups disestablished in 2013